The Meadowbrook Stock Farm, also known as Thomas R. Murray Ranch, is a site on the National Register of Historic Places located near U.S. Route 87 near Hobson, Montana.  It was added to the Register on January 13, 1992.

The main house on the property is a two-story farmhouse built of cast stone in 1908.  The blocks were made of concrete cast from molds constructed by Thomas R. Murray, the ranch founder.  Mr. Murray was a Scottish immigrant and settled on the site in 1882.  Three outbuildings were also built of cast stone, including an ice house, and there are wood frame and post-and-beam buildings as well.
The largest barn in Judith Basin County was built in 1917.

Some degree of Classical Revival style is added by an open porch spanning the south and west side of the house, with wooden columns having rounded bases, blocks above their capitals, and open bracket work supporting the porch roof.  A second story porch spans the same side of the house.

References

Farms on the National Register of Historic Places in Montana
National Register of Historic Places in Judith Basin County, Montana
1908 establishments in Montana
Neoclassical architecture in Montana
Houses completed in 1908